De Haar is the name of several villages and hamlets in the Netherlands:

 De Haar (Coevorden), Drenthe
 De Haar (Hoogeveen), Drenthe
 De Haar (Assen), Drenthe
 De Haar (Groningen)
 De Haar (Gelderland)
 De Haar (Overijssel)
 Haarzuilens, Utrecht; formerly "De Haar"
 Castle De Haar in Haarzuilens